The Society of Fellows is a group of scholars selected at the beginnings of their careers by Harvard University for their potential to advance academic wisdom, upon whom are bestowed distinctive opportunities to foster their individual and intellectual growth. Junior fellows are appointed by senior fellows based upon previous academic accomplishments and receive generous financial support for three years while they conduct independent research at Harvard University in any discipline, without being required to meet formal degree requirements or to be graded in any way. The only stipulation is that they maintain primary residence in Cambridge, Massachusetts, for the duration of their fellowship. Membership in the society is for life.

The society has contributed numerous scholars to the Harvard faculty and thus significantly influenced the tenor of discourse at the university. Among its best-known members are philosopher W. V. O. Quine, Jf '36; behaviorist B. F. Skinner, Jf '36; double Nobel laureate John Bardeen, Jf '38; economist Paul Samuelson, Jf '40; historian Arthur M. Schlesinger, Jr., Jf '43; presidential advisor McGeorge Bundy, Jf '48; historian and philosopher of science Thomas Kuhn, Jf '51; linguist and activist Noam Chomsky, Jf '55; biologist E. O. Wilson, Jf '56; cognitive scientist Marvin Minsky, Jf '57; former dean of the Harvard faculty, economist Henry Rosovsky, Jf '57; economist and whistleblower Daniel Ellsberg, Jf '59; philosopher Saul Kripke, Jf '66; ethnographer and photographer Bruce Jackson, Jf '67; Fields Medal-winning theoretical physicist Ed Witten, Jf '81; and writer, critic, and editor Leon Wieseltier, Jf '82.

History
Beginning in 1925, Harvard scholars Henry Osborn Taylor, Alfred North Whitehead and Lawrence Joseph Henderson met several times to discuss their frustration with the conditions of graduate study at the university. They believed that in order to produce exceptional research, the most able men required freedom from financial worries, fewer formal requirements, and the liberty to choose whatever object of study attracted them.

They soon found an ally in then-Harvard-president Abbott Lawrence Lowell who appointed a committee in 1926, with Henderson as chairman, to study the nature of an institution that might improve the quality of graduate education. The committee recommended the establishment of a Society of Fellows at Harvard, modeled particularly on the Prize Fellowship at Trinity College, Cambridge, and partly on those at Fondation Dosne-Thiers in Paris and All Souls' College, Oxford, with the hope that such a society would produce not only "isolated geniuses, but men who will do the work of the world".

After years of trying to attract outside donations, Lowell funded the Society himselfhis last major institutional act before his resignation in November 1932. "There being no visible source of necessary funds," he later wrote, "I gave it myself, in a kind of desperation, although it took nearly all I had." Though it was an open secret that Lowell was the source of the anonymous donation, this was never acknowledged in his presence. After Lowell's death in 1943, the donation was officially made public; it is known as the Anna Parker Lowell Fund in memory of Lowell's wife.

The society was officially inaugurated as an alternative to the Ph.D. system with the beginning of the 193334 academic year, granting fellows freedom to pursue lines of inquiry that transcended traditional academic disciplinary boundaries. Because of the core belief in the importance of informal discussions between scholars in different academic fields, both senior and junior fellows have met for dinner every Monday night during term-time. They are frequently joined by visiting scholars and Fellows are encouraged to bring guests.

Originally headquartered in a two-room suite at Eliot House, one of the university's twelve residential colleges, the society was closed to women until 1972, when Martha Nussbaum was selected as the first female junior fellow.

Current senior fellows

These are the Society's current senior fellows, who elect the incoming junior fellows:

See also
List of Harvard junior fellows
List of Black Harvard junior fellows

References

External links 
 
 About the Society

Society of Fellows
Learned societies of the United States
1933 establishments in Massachusetts